Hoorae Media (pronounced "hooray"), also known as Hoorae, is an American media production company formed in September 2020 by Issa Rae. Formerly known as Issa Rae Productions, Hoorae launched as an umbrella banner to consolidate her various film, television, and digital content companies. Insecure and A Black Lady Sketch Show are produced by Hoorae with HBO. Upcoming projects include the HBO Max series Rap Sh*t, a revival of Project Greenlight, and the film Sinkhole, produced with Monkeypaw Productions and Universal Pictures.

History 
In September 2020 Issa Rae launched Hoorae, a media company and umbrella banner to consolidate film and TV projects from Issa Rae Productions and her other media projects. Hoorae comprises a film and television division, Raedio audio content (launched in 2019), ColorCreative management, and digital brands. In March 2021 Rae signed a five-year $40 million deal that gives exclusive television rights to HBO, HBO Max, and Warner Bros., and a first-look deal to WarnerMedia brands for any film projects. 

The company promoted Sara Rastogi to senior vice president. Rae is the chief executive officer and Montrel McKay is the president of Hoorae film and TV. In 2019 the company, then known as Issa Rae Productions, opened an office in Inglewood, California. Hoorae has 23 employees as of March 2021.

Filmography

Television

Film

References

External links 
Issa Rae website
 Hoorae on IMDb
"Introducing Hoorae" on YouTube

Film production companies of the United States
Entertainment companies established in 2020
American companies established in 2020
Entertainment companies based in California
American independent film studios
Mass media companies established in 2020
African-American mass media
2020 establishments in California
 
Companies based in Los Angeles County, California